Oton is a village in Šibenik-Knin County, Croatia. It is part of the municipality of Ervenik.

Geography
Oton is located 9 kilometers northwest from the city of Knin. It is scattered across a wide area between the canyon of Zrmanja river on the west and Radljevac river on the east. To the south, the border of the village is Debelo Brdo. The village is divided into Oton Polje and Oton Brdo according to its geographical characteristics and the altitude of its hamlets. The villages of Bender and Kobilice also belong to the Oton region. Oton Polje consists of the following hamlets: Dobrijevići, Karanovići, Kneževići, Mišljeni and Vujnovići, and Oton Brdo consists of the following hamlets: Atlije, Karne, Kneževići, Kovačevići, Opačići, Sudari, Rastovići, Višekrune and Žunići. Bender consists of hamlets: Dobrijevići, Čupkovići, Pašići and Runjajići.

History
From the breakup of Yugoslavia until August 1995, Oton was in the Republic of Serbian Krajina. Until the territorial reorganization in Croatia, the settlement was part of the former large municipality of Knin.

Culture
In Oton, there is a temple of the Serbian Orthodox Church of St. Elijah from 1702.

Surnames
Surnames from Oton are:

Atlija — Orthodox, celebrate St. Nicholas
Bjelotomić – Orthodox, celebrate St. Nicholas
Višekruna – Orthodox, celebrate St. Jovan
Vujnović - Orthodox, celebrate St. Arandjela
Vujinović — Orthodox, they celebrate. St. Nicholas
Devrnja – Orthodox, celebrate St. George
Dobrijević - Orthodox, celebrate St. Stephen and St. George
Žunić – Orthodox, celebrate St. George
Karna – Orthodox, celebrate St. Michael
Knežević – Orthodox, celebrate St. Nicholas
Kovačević - Orthodox, they celebrate St. Stephen
Opačić - Orthodox, celebrate St. Port
Pašić - Orthodox, celebrate St. Stephen
Popović - Orthodox, celebrate St. George
Radan - Orthodox Christians celebrate St. Stephen
Rastović - Orthodox, celebrate St. Jovan
Sudar - Orthodox Christians celebrate St. Cosmas and Damian
Čupković - Orthodox Christians celebrate St. George

References

Populated places in Šibenik-Knin County